This is a list of Polish musicians and musical groups.

Female vocalists 

 Aga Zaryan
 Alicja Boratyn
 Alicja Janosz
 Ania Dąbrowska
 Ania Wiśniewska (Ania Świątczak)
 Anita Lipnicka
 Anna German
 Anna Jantar
 Anna Maria Jopek
 Basia
 Doda
 Cleo
 Edyta Bartosiewicz
 Edyta Geppert
 Edyta Górniak
 Elzbieta Dmoch
 Ewa Farna
 Ewa Sonnet
 Ewelina Flinta
 Ewelina Lisowska
 Gaba Kulka
 Gosia Andrzejewicz
 Irena Santor
 Joanna Liszowska
 Julia Marcell
 Justyna Majkowska
 Justyna Steczkowska
 Kayah
 Kari Amirian
 Kasia Cerekwicka
 Kasia Nosowska
 Kasia Kowalska
 Kasia Stankiewicz
 Magda Femme
 Magda Umer
 Majka Jeżowska
 Maria Peszek
 Mandaryna
 Marika
 Marta Mirska
 Maryla Rodowicz
 Mela Koteluk
 Mika Urbaniak
 Monika Borzym
 Monika Brodka
 Natalia Kukulska
 Natalia Przybysz (alias N'Talia, Natu)
 Natasza Urbańska
 Novika
 Patricia Kazadi
 Patrycja Markowska
 Reni Jusis
 Renata Przemyk
 Shazza
 Slawa Przybylska
 Tatiana Okupnik
 Violetta Villas

Male vocalists 

 Andrzej "Piasek" Piaseczny
 Artur Andrus
 Artur Gadowski
 Artur Rojek
 Czesław Niemen
 Czesław Śpiewa
 Dawid Podsiadło
 Gienek Loska
 Grzegorz Turnau
 Kamil Bednarek
 Kazik Staszewski
 Krzysztof Krawczyk
 Krzysztof Zalewski
 Leszek Malinowski
 Maciej Maleńczuk
 Waldemar Sierański
 Maciej Silski
 Marcin Rozynek
 Michał Szpak
 Michał Wiśniewski
 Mieczysław Fogg
 Muniek Staszczyk
 Pablopavo
 Piotr Lisiecki
 Piotr Rogucki
 Robert Gawliński
 Seweryn Krajewski
 Stan Borys
 Stanisław Sojka
 Tadeusz Nalepa
 Tomasz Makowiecki
 Wojciech Waglewski

Classical
 Sebastian Niedziela (born 1975), composer, guitarist
 Frédéric Chopin
Karol Kurpiński
Stefania Łukowicz-Mokwa

Jazz

 Aga Zaryan
 Andrzej Kurylewicz
 Anna Maria Jopek
 Czesław Niemen
 Kazimierz Jonkisz
 Krzysztof Komeda
 Leszek Możdżer
 Marcin Wasilewski
 Marek Napiórkowski
 Michał Urbaniak
 Monika Borzym
 Motion Trio
 Tomasz Stańko
 Urszula Dudziak
 Wojciech Karolak
 Zbigniew Namysłowski

Hip-hop/rap 

 AbradAb
 Emade
 Kaliber 44
 L.U.C
 Liroy
 Magik
 Małolat
 O.S.T.R.
 Onar
 Paktofonika
 Peja
 Pezet
 Płomień 81
 Popek
 Sokół
 Tede

Pop/R&B/Soul/Alternative 

 Blue Café
 The Dumplings
 June
 Őszibarack
 Sistars
 Smolik

Reggae 

 AbradAb
 Bednarek
 Izrael
 Marika
 Mesajah 
 Pablopavo
 Star Guard Muffin
 Vavamuffin

Rock 

 Akurat
 Armia
 Big Cyc
 BRAThANKI (folk-rock)
 Breakout (blues-rock)
 Bruno Schulz
 Brygada Kryzys
 Budka Suflera
 Coma
 Cool Kids of Death
 Czerwone Gitary
 Czerwono-Czarni
 Czesław Niemen
 De Press
 Dezerter (punk-rock)
 Dżem
 Exodus
 Happysad
 Hey
 Homo Twist
 Hurt
 IRA
 Kazik Na Żywo (KNŻ)
 Kim Nowak
 KSU
 Kult
 L.Stadt
 Lady Pank
 Lombard
 Łąki Łan
 Lux Perpetua
 Luxtorpeda
 Maanam
 Muchy
 Myslovitz
 Niebiesko-Czarni
 O.N.A.
 Perfect
 Püdelsi
 Pustki
 Republika
 Riverside
 Rhythm and Blues
 SBB
 Siekiera
 Skaldowie
 Strachy na Lachy
 Sztywny Pal Azji
 T.Love
 The Car Is on Fire
 TSA
 Virgin
 Voo Voo
 Wilki
 Ya Hozna

Sung poetry 

Agnieszka Osiecka
Emanuel Szlechter
Ewa Demarczyk
Grzegorz Turnau
Jacek Kaczmarski
Jan Krzysztof Kelus
Jeremi Przybora
Jerzy Ficowski
Jonasz Kofta
Konstanty Ildefons Gałczyński
Ludwik Starski
Maciej Zembaty
Magda Umer
Marek Grechuta
Michał Żebrowski
Stare Dobre Małżeństwo
Świetliki (Marcin Świetlicki)
Wojciech Młynarski

Black metal/death metal/heavy metal 

 Behemoth
 Decapitated
 Fanthrash
 Frontside
 Graveland
 Lost Soul
 Lux Occulta
 Thy Disease
 Trauma
 TSA
 Vader
 Vesania
 Mgła

Power metal 

 Lux Perpetua

Punk 

 Abaddon
 Acid Drinkers
 Alians
 Apatia
 Armia
 Brygada Kryzys
 Bulbulators
 Dezerter
 Farben Lehre
 Fliper
 Kryzys
 KSU
 Kult
 Łąki Łan
 Moskwa
 Post Regiment
 Sedes
 Siekiera
 Śmierć Kliniczna
 Third Degree
 Tilt
 TZN Xenna
 Włochaty

Folk 
 Brathanki
 Golec uOrkiestra
 Halina Mlynkova
Tulia
 Trebunie Tutki
 Warsaw Village Band
 Zakopower

Synth pop/electronic/EBM/disco polo/gothic 

 Artrosis
 Bogdan Raczynski
 Closterkeller
 Cold Therapy
 Jacaszek
 Imperium
 Kombii
 Moonlight
 Shazza
 Skalpel (nu jazz)

Opera 

 Irene Abendroth (1871–1932)
 Piotr Beczała (1966–)
 Grażyna Brodzińska (1951–)
 Anna Cymmerman
 Wojtek Drabowicz (1966–2007)
 Ján Koehler (–1895)
 Adolf Kozieradski (1835–1901)
 Mariusz Kwiecień (1972–)
 Bernard Ładysz (1922–2020)
 Maria Mitrosz (1970–)
 Aleksander Myszuga (1853–1922)
 Jozef Michal Poniatowski (1814–1873)
 Alfred Orda (1915–2004)
 Jadwiga Rappé (1952–)
 Józefina Reszke (1855–1891)
 Paulina Rivoli (1823–1881)
 Arnold Rutkowski 
 Ada Sari (1886–1968)
 Sophie Stebnowska (1753–1848)
 Stefania Toczyska (1943–)
 Agnieszka Truskolaska (1755–1831)
 Ganna Walska (1887–1984)
 Stanisława Zawadzka (1890–1988)

 
Polish
Musicians
Musicians